Pagham Cricket Club Ground is a cricket ground in Pagham, Sussex.  The first recorded match on the ground was in 1976, when Sussex played the first first-class match at the ground against Oxford University.  Sussex played the second and final first-class fixture to be held at the ground in 1979 when they played Oxford University.  Sussex also used the ground in 1977, when they played Ireland in a non first-class match.

In local domestic cricket, the venue is the home ground of Pagham Cricket Club.

Records

First-class
 Highest team total: 357/4 by Sussex v Oxford University, 1979
 Lowest team total: 99 by Oxford University v Sussex, 1976
 Highest individual innings: 105 not out by Chris Tavaré for Oxford University v Sussex, 1976
 Best bowling in an innings: 6-33 by Richard Savage for Oxford University v Sussex, 1976
 Best bowling in a match: 12-99 by Richard Savage, as above

References

External links
Pagham Cricket Club Ground on CricketArchive
Pagham Cricket Club Ground on Cricinfo

Cricket grounds in West Sussex